Ignatius Sichelbart  also Sickelbart, Sickelpart; Chinese 艾啟蒙 / 艾启蒙 Ài Qǐměng or Ai Ch'i-meng; (September 26, 1708 Nejdek – October 6, 1780 Beijing), was a German-Bohemian Jesuit missionary and painter.

After his novitiate in Brno and the study of theology in Olomouc, Sichelbart was assigned as the missionary to China's Provincial Government in 1745. He was joined on the mission by two other painters Giuseppe Castiglione and Jean Denis Attiret. Together while in China, the artists combined their European techniques with traditional Chinese painting to create new styles.

After successful military campaigns known as the Ten Great Campaigns in Central Asia, the Qianlong Emperor commissioned depictions of the battles. The work was carried out by the Jesuit artists, among them Sichelbart. The group produced 16 tableaux, which were engraved in France in 1774. As a reward for his service and work, he was promoted to director of the Imperial Painting Academy and court painter to the Emperor. Sichelbart died in Beijing in 1780. He was buried in the Jesuits' Zhalan Cemetery.

References
 Constantin von Wurzbach: Biographical Dictionary of the Empire, Austria Volume 34. Publisher L. C. Zamarski, Vienna 1877, p 209 f
 Rudolf Grulich: The contribution of the Czech lands for the 17th World Mission and 18th Century, 1981  
 Some content translated from corresponding German Wikipedia article

1708 births
1780 deaths
People from Nejdek
People from the Kingdom of Bohemia
German Bohemian people
18th-century German Jesuits
German Roman Catholic missionaries
Jesuit missionaries in China
18th-century German painters
18th-century German male artists
German male painters